The 2016 season was Helsingin Jalkapalloklubi's 108th competitive season. HJK is the most successful football club in Finland in terms of titles, with 27 Finnish Championships, 12 Finnish Cup titles, 5 Finnish League Cup titles, one appearance in the UEFA Champions League group stages and one appearance in the UEFA Europa League group stages.

After finishing 3rd in the 2015 Veikkausliiga season, HJK entered the 2016–17 UEFA Europa League first qualifying round. For the 2nd consecutive season, HJK U-19 competed in the UEFA Youth League.

Season Review
31 January: HJK kicked off their 20th League Cup campaign with a 1 - 0 win over IFK Mariehamn. HJK eventually finished third in Group B, however, remained unbeaten throughout the campaign.
12 February: Jarno Parikka announced his retirement from football due to a knee injury.
19 March: HJK started their 62nd Finnish Cup edition with a 3 - 1 victory over FC Honka/Akatemia and advanced to the sixth round.
2 April: HJK started their 27th Veikkausliiga season with a 2 - 0 home win against IFK Mariehamn. Atomu Tanaka headed in the first goal of the 2016 Veikkausliiga season from a cross delivered by Taye Taiwo.
31 May: Taye Taiwo was named the Veikkausliiga Player of the Month for May 2016. Mika Lehkosuo was likewise named the Manager of the Month.
30 June: HJK started their 2016–17 UEFA Europa League campaign with a 0 - 2 away win against Lithuanian side FK Atlantas. A week later HJK went through to the next qualifying round after beating Atlantas 3 - 1 on aggregate.
4 August: HJK's 2016–17 UEFA Europa League campaign came to an end after a 0 - 2 home defeat to IFK Göteborg. Göteborg advanced to the play-off round 3 - 2 on aggregate.
24 September: HJK were beaten on penalties in the 2016 Finnish Cup Final by SJK, who were crowned Finnish Cup Champions for the first time in club history. Alfredo Morelos was the top scorer of the competition with 7 goals in 4 matches.
12 October: Alfredo Morelos was named the Veikkausliiga Player of the Month for September 2016.
23 October: HJK finished runners-up in the 2016 Veikkausliiga season with 58 points from 33 matches. Alfredo Morelos was the top scorer for HJK with 16 league goals and a total of 30 goals in all competitions.

Squad

On loan

Transfers

Winter

In:

Out:

Summer

In:

Out:

Friendlies

Competitions

Veikkausliiga

The 2016 Veikkausliiga season began 2 April 2016 and ended on 23 October 2016.

League table

Results summary

Results by matchday

Results

Finnish Cup

Final

League Cup

UEFA Europa League

Qualifying rounds

Squad statistics

Appearances and goals

|-
|colspan="14"|Players from Klubi-04 who appeared:

|-
|colspan="14"|Players who left HJK during the season:

|-
|colspan="14"|Players away from the club on loan:

|}

Goal scorers

Disciplinary record

References

2016
Hjk